The Great Canadian Food Show is a Canadian television series, which has aired on CBC Television, with repeats later seen on Food Network Canada.

Hosted by Carlo Rota, the series travels across Canada to profile the many varieties of Canadian cuisine.

External links
 Great Canadian Food Show

CBC Television original programming
Food Network (Canadian TV channel) original programming
2000s Canadian cooking television series